Sergei Stadler (Russian: Сергей Стадлер) is a Russian violinist and conductor. He is currently Artistic Director and Chief Conductor of the Saint Petersburg Symphony Orchestra.

Biography 

Laureate of the international music competitions:

1976 — Concertino Praga (1st prize);
1979 — Marguerite Long–Jacques Thibaud Competition (Paris) (II Grand Prix and Special Prize for the best performance of French music);
1980 — International Jean Sibelius Violin Competition (Helsinki) (2nd Prize and Special Public Award);
1982 — The International Tchaikovsky Competition (Moscow) (I Prize and Gold Medal).

Childhood and the beginning of the career 
Sergei Stadler was born on May 20, 1962 in Leningrad. He began to study music at the age of 5. His mother, a pianist and accompanist of the St. Petersburg Conservatory, taught him how to play the piano. He started to play the violin under the guidance of his father, the violist of the St. Petersburg Philharmonic Orchestra.

Stadler graduated from the Special Music School under the Saint Petersburg Conservatory. Then he entered the Saint Petersburg Conservatory and graduated in three and a half years due to a busy concert and tour schedule. Later he was enrolled on postgraduate course of the Moscow Conservatory, after which Sergei Stadler began teaching violin art at the Saint Petersburg Conservatory. His professors were B. Sergeev, M. Wayman, B. Gutnikov, L. Kogan, V. Tretyakov, one of his teachers was David Oistrakh.

World fame 
In 1984, after a tour with the Orchestra of the Saint Petersburg Philharmonic around Austria and Germany, his European fame came to the musician. 30 concerts were played, at which the music of Tchaikovsky, Brahms, Sibelius, Glazunov, Prokofiev was performed. H. von Karajan attended the concerts in Vienna.

During this period, Sergei Stadler has been playing the Stradivarius violin, owned by the State Collection. Before Stadler, David Oistrakh had been playing the same instrument for sixteen years.

December 13, 1985 was a remarkable day, because a joint concert with Svyatoslav Richter was held at the Museum A.S. Pushkin in Moscow, where Caprices by Paganini and Caprices by Schumann after Paganini sounded.

Being the most welcomed guest on the 300th Bach’s anniversary, he played all the sonatas and partitas in the Church of St. Thomas in Leipzig in 1985. This was followed by a tour in Japan: sonatas and partitas by Bach and Paganini’s “24 Caprices”. In 1986 in Germany he was awarded a prize for best criticism of the year. During this period, he played about 150 concerts a year.

In 1987, Sergei Stadler became one of the first foreign soloists to come on a tour around China after a long break. Concerts were played in Beijing and Shanghai.

In January 1988, the musician’s first performance with an orchestra without a conductor took place because of a sad event – two days before the concert, maestro E. Mravinsky had died. However, held in the Leningrad Philharmonic, the concert marked the beginning of a series of successful projects with an orchestra without a conductor.

In the early 90s, the musician played with the Russian National Orchestra all of Mozart’s violin compositions in Moscow and recorded Mozart’s concerts with the Saint Petersburg Philharmonic Orchestra.

The Paganini violin 
A very special event in the musician’s life was related to the arrival of the violin Niccolo Paganini in St. Petersburg in 1995. Sergei Stadler became an organizer of the two-day festival “The Paganini Violin in the Hermitage”, held with the support of the governments of St. Petersburg and Genoa and sponsored by the fashion house Trussardi. Also he was the first performer to be honored to play the violin “Il Cannone” Guarneri del Gesu in open concerts, after which Academician Likhachev named him «Russian Paganini».

The violin arrived in the Saint Petersburg in 2003 for the second time. The event and concert at the Saint Petersburg Philharmonic, in which Sergei Stadler again played the legendary Italian violinist’s instrument, were timed to coincide with the 300th anniversary of Saint Petersburg.

The maestro of Russian and World classical music 
From 1995 to present, Sergei Stadler has been organizing annual New Year’s concerts in the Concert Hall P. Tchaikovsky in Moscow. Since 1997, cycles of concerts “Music in the Hermitage Halls” have been organized in one of the most famous Museums of the world — the music performed by the maestro sounds in the Georgievsky, Armorial, Knights, Pavilion, Aleksandrovsky, Concert and other iconic halls of the Winter Palace. A number of opera productions were specially made for the Hermitage Theater.

From 1998 to 2008 he was the artistic director of the International Music Festival in Perm. From 1998 to 2001 he was the Chief Conductor of the Theater of the St. Petersburg Conservatory. In 2001, he played the marathon concert “10 Beethoven Sonatas in One Evening” together with his sister Julia Stadler in Moscow, St. Petersburg, cities of Russia and Europe.

Truly remarkable concerts were played in the same years in Paris: concerts by Bach, Beethoven and Brahms, a concert by Tchaikovsky with E. Svetlanov. Beethoven’s chamber music was performed in castles in Germany with W. Sawallisch, Spanish music — at the Prado Museum in Madrid with G. Oppitz. In 2008, music by Bach and Mozart’s Requiem were played at the Tower of King David in Jerusalem.

Led by Sergei Stadler, L. Bernstein’s Dibbuk, O. Messiaen’s Turangalil symphony, H. Berlioz’s operas, Ivan the Terrible by G. Bizet, and Peter the Great by A. Gretry were performed in Russia for the first time. The musician often becomes a first performer of contemporary composers’s music, such as concert No. 2 B. Tishchenko, a concert, sonatas, and a monody “After reading Euripides” for violin solo S. Slonimsky, Echo-sonata for violin solo R. Shchedrin, etc.

Saint Petersburg Symphony Orchestra 
Currently, Sergei Stadler is the Artistic Director and Chief Conductor of the Saint Petersburg Symphony Orchestra, the Artistic Director of the «Petersburg-Concert» concert organization. The Saint Petersburg Symphony Orchestra was created because of the initiative of Sergei Stadler in 2013. To present it is one of the best orchestras in Saint Petersburg, which plays about 500 concerts in Russia and abroad. The orchestra regularly performs at the Saint Petersburg and Moscow Philharmonic, the Hermitage and Alexandrinsky Theater, the State Academic Chapel of St. Petersburg, and the Large and Small Halls of the Moscow Conservatory.

Among the concert cycles for violin and orchestra without a conductor: five concerts by Mozart, all compositions for violin and orchestra of Beethoven and Tchaikovsky. Also among the projects: Paganiniana, Spanish violin, Magyar violin, French virtuoso violin music, Wieniawski and Polish violin art, Tchaikovsky and Russian violin tradition, Offenbach-gala. In addition, the Orchestra was remembered for such opera productions as Tannhäuser by R. Wagner, Turandot, Tosca and Manon Lescaut by G. Puccini, Il Trovatore by D. Verdi, Die Fledermaus by I. Strauss, Le Nozze di Figaro by V.A. Mozart, etc. The hallmark of the orchestra became marathons, which are held annually since the creation of the team. The following were played in one evening: six Tchaikovsky symphonies (2014), all Brahms symphonies (2015), from spring to autumn 2016 — all Mozart symphonies, and within the framework of the final marathon — 12 most iconic (2016); all Beethoven symphonies (2017), for which the orchestra was included in the Russian Book of Records as “the longest philharmonic concert with a programme from the works of one author performed by one symphony orchestra under the direction of one conductor”; all Liszt’s symphonic poems (2018).

Teaching and mentoring 
Since 2007, the Maestro has been teaching at the Moscow Conservatory. From 2008 to 2011 he was the Rector of the Saint Petersburg Conservatory. Since 2018, he has been leading an educational programme “The instrumental performance practice: violin” at Saint Petersburg State University. He holds master classes in Russia, the USA, Germany, Norway, Poland, Israel, Finland, Spain, France, Italy, Singapore, China, Portugal and other countries. He is known to be an Honorary Professor of the Beijing and Kiev Conservatoires. An Honorary Advisor to the Chinese-Russian Association for the Study of Strategy “One Belt and One Way”.

Work 
He has performed in such halls as:

Musikverein (Vienna), La Scala (Milan), Royal Festival Hall (London), Salle Pleyel (Paris), Berlin Philharmonie, Alte Oper (Frankfurt), Herculessaal (Munich), Semperoper (Dresden), Concertgebouw (Amsterdam), Teatro Real (Madrid), Tonhalle (Zurich), Palau de la Música Catalana (Barcelona), Megaron (Athens), Rudolfinum (Prague), Santory Hall (Tokyo), etc.

On such music festivals as:

Salzburg, Vienna, Bonn, Helsinki, Istanbul, Athens, Jerusalem, Boston, Bregenz, Prague, Mallorca, Spoletto, Stavanger, Provence, etc.

With such conductors as:

V. Ashkenazy, W. Sawallisch, K. Mazur, M. Jansons, E. Svetlanov, G. Rozhdestvensky, Yu. Temirkanov, V. Gergiev, F. Welser-Möst, V. Fedoseev, F. Luisi, M. Pletnev, P. Steinberg, S. Bychkov, B. de Billi, M. Yanovsky, S. Sondeckis, V. Neumann, L. Gardelli and others.

In ensembles with:

H. Schiff, V. Tretyakov, L. Isakadze, Yu. Rakhlin, Yu. Bashmet, N. Gutman, A. Knyazev, T. Merk, D. Geringas, P. Zukerman, N. Znaider, D. Sitkovetsky, L. Kavakos, A. Rudin, F. Helmerson, B. Pergamenschikov, G. Rivinius, R. Kirshbaum, A. Menezes, P. Donohoe, J.-Y. Thibaudet, W. Sawallisch, E. Kisin, G. Oppitz, D. Matsuev, M. Dalberto, B. Berezovsky, D. Alekseev, J. Lagerspetz, F. Gottlieb, Yu. Stadler.

Creative collaborations with:

Actors: O. Tabakov, K. Lavrov, S. Jursky, A. Abdulov, I. Dmitriev, O. Ostroumova and others.

Singers: A. Netrebko, O. Borodin, S. Studer, etc.

Ballet dancers: D. Vishneva, U. Lopatkina, N. Pavlova, N. Ananiashvili, I. Liepa, F. Ruzimatov, N. Tsiskaridze, A. Fadeev and others.

He has performed with such orchestras as:

Svetlanov State Orchestra, Russian National Orchestra, Tchaikovsky Big Symphony Orchestra, Mariinsky Theater Orchestra, Bolshoi Theater Orchestra, Moscow Philharmonic Orchestra, Saint Petersburg Philharmonic Orchestra, London Philharmonic Orchestra, Czech Philharmonic Orchestra, Vienna Symphony Orchestra, Orchestra De Paris, National de France, Gewandhaus (Leipzig), Staatskapelle (Dresden), Orchestras of Melbourne, Jerusalem, Toronto, Helsinki, Orchestre de la Suisse Romande, etc.

He was the main conductor of the Russian Symphony Orchestra, the Opera and Ballet Theater of the St. Petersburg Conservatory and the Yekaterinburg Opera and Ballet Theater. Currently he is Artistic Director and Chief Conductor of the St. Petersburg Symphony Orchestra.

References

External links 
 Sergei Stadler's official website

1962 births
Russian violinists
Male violinists
Living people
21st-century violinists
21st-century Russian male musicians